TRT HD was the second HD television channel of TRT after TRT 4K. It was launched on 24 May 2010. It broadcasts events such as the Eurovision Song Contest in HD.

References 

Defunct television channels in Turkey
Turkish-language television stations
Television channels and stations established in 2010
Television channels and stations disestablished in 2016
High-definition television
2010 establishments in Turkey
Mass media in Ankara
Turkish Radio and Television Corporation